Viktor Sotnikov (born 17 July 1974) is a Russian triple jumper. He finished ninth at the 1996 Olympic Games.

Achievements

External links  

1974 births
Living people
Russian male triple jumpers
Athletes (track and field) at the 1996 Summer Olympics
Olympic athletes of Russia